The 2017–18 Scottish Challenge Cup, known as the IRN-BRU Cup due to sponsorship reasons, is the 27th season of the competition. The tournament took on a similar format from the previous season, however, two teams from the Republic of Ireland's Airtricity League (Sligo Rovers and Bray Wanderers) entered the competition for the first time taking the total number of participating clubs to 56. This was the second season with two clubs from both Northern Ireland and Wales competing alongside the 30 members of the 2017–18 Scottish Championship, 2017–18 Scottish League One and 2017–18 Scottish League Two, four teams from the 2017–18 Highland Football League and four from the 2017–18 Lowland Football League as well as the Under-20 teams of the teams competing in the 2017–18 Scottish Premiership. The Welsh teams were The New Saints and Connah's Quay Nomads while the Northern Irish teams were Crusaders and Linfield.

Dundee United were the defending champions after they beat St Mirren 2–1 in the 2017 final, but were eliminated in the Quarter-finals by Crusaders.

Irn Bru replaced Petrofac as the main sponsor of the competition in June 2016.

Format

First round
The draw for the first round was made at 1 pm on 27 June 2017 at the Summerlee Industrial Museum in Coatbridge and was streamed live on the SPFL's Facebook page. The draw was regionalised into northern and southern sections with each section containing 14 SPFL clubs, four Highland Football League or Lowland Football League clubs and six U20s teams with any team able to face any other within their section.

North Section

Draw
Teams in Bold advanced to the second round.

Matches

South Section

Draw
Teams in Bold advanced to the second round.

Matches

Notes

Second round

Draw
The draw for the second round was made at 1 pm on 17 August 2017 at the Falkirk Wheel and streamed live on the SPFL's Facebook page. The draw was unseeded but the six non-Scottish teams were kept apart with one team from each country drawn at home and one away. Linfield were allocated an away tie due to the unavailability of Windsor Park so Crusaders played at home.

Teams in Italics were not known at the time of the draw. Teams in Bold advanced to the third round.

Matches

The SPFL launched an investigation after two different methods of penalty shootout were used in the second round matches that required the tiebreaker. Montrose's 6–5 win over Ayr United used the traditional ABAB method where one team follows the other whereas The New Saints' 6–5 win over Livingston used the trial ABBA method where one team goes first before the other takes two consecutively and then the first team takes their second. SPFL rules state that the ABAB method should be used. The mix up is suspected to have come after confusion between the Irish referee and Welsh linesmen in The New Saints-Livingston match over which method was to be used. The result of the investigation is not expected to impact the result of The New Saints-Livingston tie.

Third round

Draw
The draw for the third round was made at 1 pm on 5 September 2017 at the Riverside Museum and was streamed live on the SPFL's Facebook page. The draw was unseeded and there were no longer any requirements for non-SPFL sides to be kept apart.

Teams in Bold advanced to the third round.

Matches

Quarter-finals

Draw
The draw for the quarter-finals was made at 1 pm on 10 October 2017 at the Forth Road Bridge Visitor Centre and was streamed live on the SPFL's Facebook page. The draw was unseeded.

Teams in Bold advanced to the semi-finals.

Matches

Semi-finals

Draw
The draw for the semi-finals was made at 1pm on 14 November 2017 at the SEC Armadillo and was streamed live on the SPFL's Facebook page. The draw was unseeded.

Teams in Bold advanced to the final.

Matches

Final

Statistics

Top goalscorers

Player of the Round
The Golden Ball Award is a 'Player of the Round' award given to the player who is adjudged to have had the best performance of that round out of all the players in teams left competing in that round of the competition. The winner is voted for by supporters from a chosen short-list of players, which is posted on the Irn-Bru Football Twitter page.

Broadcasting rights
The domestic broadcasting rights for the competition are held jointly by BBC Alba, S4C (for matches involving Welsh teams) and subscription channel Premier Sports. Prior to the re-format in the 2016–17 season, BBC Alba had exclusive rights.

The following matches are to be broadcast live on UK television:

References

External links
Scottish Challenge Cup at the Scottish Professional Football League

Scottish Challenge Cup seasons
Challenge Cup
3